Dominique Reymond (born 12 February 1957) is a French actress. She has appeared in more than seventy films since 1984.

She has been to the Geneva Conservatory.

Selected filmography

References

External links
 

1957 births
Living people
Actors from Geneva
French film actresses
Audiobook narrators